Elato is a coral atoll of three islands in the central Caroline Islands in the Pacific Ocean, and forms a legislative district in Yap State in the Federated States of Micronesia.

Geography
The northern component, called Elato, contains two lagoons and three islets. It is connected to the southern component, called Lamolior, by a narrow submarine ridge. Lamolior has two islets. Both components are part of the same seamount. The total land area for both components combined is only . Nearby Olimarao Atoll belongs administratively to Elato.

History
As with all of the Caroline Islands, sovereignty passed to the Empire of Germany in 1899. The island came under the control of the Empire of Japan after World War I, and was subsequently administered under the South Seas Mandate. Following World War II, the island came under the control of the United States of America and was administered as part of the Trust Territory of the Pacific Islands from 1947, and became part of the Federated States of Micronesia from 1979.

References
 Columbia Gazetteer of the World. Vol. 1, p. 900

External links

Report of the German South Pacific Expedition 1908-1910

Islands of Yap
Municipalities of Yap
Atolls of the Federated States of Micronesia